

History
There are more than 7000 votes in Sadwal, around 2500 to 3000 houses, and 18000 people. There are two big villages around Sadwal one is Bhoun in the west and the other is Odherwal (the capital of the Union council). There are three big mosques in Sadwal Paki masjid, Ghousia masjid, and Masjid Bilal. Sadwal has a Martyr of the Pak army named Mr. Shehzad S/O Lal Khan in the Wah Factory blast. Ansar Mehmood S/O Feroz Awan is also a shaheed of Sadwàl In the giyari sector of Siachin glacier. The majority of the people are agriculturists. Many people of Sadwal work in Gulf Countries, Europe and a large number of overseas are in Hong Kong. There is a High school for girls and boys with a government dispensary and post office. There is also a UBL branch in the village. SADWAL people have many casts like Minhas, Malik, Kahout, Butt, Awan, Janjua, Bhutta, Maikan, Mehr, Gondal, etc. Sadwal's peoples are very loving and caring. The great personalities of Sadwal are Col.(retd.)Dr. Ahmed Farjam, Captain Imran Ashraf, Mian Haji Abdul Rashid, Sir Shoukat Aziz Principal Al Rehman public school Sadwal, Chaudry Shoukat Hussain(Late), SUB Ghulam Raza(Late), Malik Aziz ur Rehman (ICTP), Malik Fida Ur Rehman journalist, And of course the Mohsin e Sadwal "Muhammad Ayub Kahout"(Late). In the youth, the prominent personalities are Baber Naseer(Adv), Sibtain Ameer banker, Shahid Mehmood mikan(Wapda), and Arshad Mehmood Kahout BismiAllah tent service. Master Ijaz SB, Ghulam Abbas, Azhar Hussain, Asghar Hussain, Anjum Metab malik, Abdul Wahab Kahout, and Tayyab Hasnain SB are well-renowned personalities of Sadwal, famous due to their social work and character. The Sadwal welfare organization is contributing a lot towards cleanliness, greenery, and welfare of the village.

Language
Inhabitants of Sadwal speak Punjabi and Urdu.English is also spoken by educated people.

Educational institutions
Government Higher Secondary School Sadwal (boys +Girls).
Al-Rehman public secondary school Sadwal.

Welfare organizations
Sadwal welfare organization.

See sadwal on Google Earth

References

 Populated places in Chakwal District